The 2016–17 Montreal Canadiens season was the 108th season for the franchise that was founded on December 4, 1909, and their 100th season in the National Hockey League (NHL).

Standings

Schedule and results

Pre-season

Regular season

Playoffs

Player statistics
Final stats

Skaters

Goaltenders

†Denotes player spent time with another team before joining Canadiens. Stats reflect time with Canadiens only.
‡Traded mid-season. Stats reflect time with Canadiens only.

Suspensions/fines

Awards and honours

Awards

Milestones

Transactions
The Canadiens have been involved in the following transactions during the 2016–17 season:

Trades

Free agents acquired

Free agents lost

Lost via waivers

Player signings

Draft picks

Below are the Montreal Canadiens' selections at the 2016 NHL Entry Draft, held on June 24–25, 2016 at the First Niagara Center in Buffalo, New York.

Notes

 The Canadiens' second-round pick went to the Chicago Blackhawks as the result of a trade on June 24, 2016 that sent Andrew Shaw to Montreal in exchange for Minnesota's second-round pick in 2016 (45th overall) and this pick.
 This was actually the Vancouver Canucks' fifth-round pick, which went to the Canadiens as the result of a trade on July 1, 2015 that sent Brandon Prust to Vancouver in exchange for Zack Kassian and this pick. The Montreal Canadiens' fifth-round pick had previously gone to the Buffalo Sabres as the result of a trade on March 2, 2015 that sent Brian Flynn to Montreal in exchange for this pick.
 This was Winnipeg Jets' seventh-round pick, as the Canadiens' seventh-round pick had gone to the Buffalo Sabres as the result of a trade on March 2, 2015 that sent Torrey Mitchell to Montreal in exchange for Jack Nevins and this pick. The Jet's pick went to the Canadiens as the result of a trade on June 25, 2016 that sent a seventh-round pick in 2017 to Winnipeg in exchange for this pick.

References

Montreal Canadiens seasons
Montreal Canadiens
Mont